Toul Kok TVK Station is a station on Line 02 of the Phnom Penh BRT bus rapid transit network in Phnom Penh, Cambodia, located on Samdech Penn Nouth, next to the Toul Kok radio tower.

See also
 Phnom Penh City Bus
 Transport in Phnom Penh
 Line 02 (Phnom Penh Bus Rapid Transit)

External links
 Official Page of Phnom Penh Municipal Bus Services

Phnom Penh Bus Rapid Transit stations